Shirley Levoy "S.L." Abbott (July 23, 1924 – April 23, 2013) was an American businessman, rancher, politician, and ambassador.

Born in Fairview, Oklahoma, Abbott lived on a dairy farm in Minnesota with his family and then moved to El Paso, Texas. He served in the United States Army during World War II. He received his bachelor and optometrist degrees from Pacific University. He then practiced optometry in El Paso and was a rancher. He served in the Texas House of Representatives as a Republican 1977–1978.  Abbott had asked the Reagan administration to appoint him as United States Ambassador to Belize. Instead, the administration tried to nominate him as United States Ambassador to Guyana, but the nomination was withdrawn. Finally, in 1983, Abbott was appointed United States Ambassador to Lesotho by President Ronald Reagan. Abbott died from complications of congestive heart failure in Coronado, California at age 88.

Notes

1924 births
2013 deaths
People from Major County, Oklahoma
People from El Paso, Texas
Pacific University alumni
Military personnel from Oklahoma
Businesspeople from Texas
Republican Party members of the Texas House of Representatives
Ambassadors of the United States to Lesotho
Ranchers from Texas
American optometrists
United States Army personnel of World War II
20th-century American businesspeople
Politicians from Oklahoma